William Wallace Peterson (born June 6, 1945) is a former professional American football player who played linebacker for five seasons for the Cincinnati Bengals one season with Kansas City Chiefs and one season with New England Patriots.

References

1945 births
American football linebackers
Cincinnati Bengals players
Kansas City Chiefs players
San Jose State Spartans football players
Living people
American Football League players